Narsampet Assembly constituency is a constituency of Telangana Legislative Assembly, India. It is one of the constituencies in Warangal district. It is part of Mahabubabad Lok Sabha constituency .

Peddi Sudharshan Reddy who contested in election as MLA from Telangana Rashtra Samithi won the seat in 2018.

Mandals
The Assembly Constituency presently comprises the following Mandals:

Members of Legislative Assembly

Election results

Telangana Legislative Assembly election, 2018

Telangana Legislative Assembly election, 2014

See also
 List of constituencies of Telangana Legislative Assembly

References

Assembly constituencies of Telangana
Hanamkonda district